The Nippon Tornadoes (日本 颶風) was a team of the International Basketball League that began play in the 2009 season.  A representative team from the Japanese Basketball Academy, the Tornadoes were based in Matsuyama, Ehime, but maintain a national identity and played their full 20-game schedule on the road.

Notable players
Soichiro Fujitaka
Tomoyuki Umeda
Joe Wolfinger

Coaches
Ryutaro Onodera
Shinji Tomiyama (asst)

External links
Team page on IBL website

Sports teams in Ehime Prefecture
 
Defunct basketball teams in Japan
International Basketball League teams
Basketball teams established in 2008
2008 establishments in Japan
Basketball teams disestablished in 2013
2013 disestablishments in Japan
Matsuyama, Ehime